Johnny Nobody is a 1961 British drama film made by Viceroy Films Limited, with John R. Sloan as producer, and Irving Allen and Albert R. Broccoli as executive producers. It was directed by the British film and stage actor Nigel Patrick, who also took a leading role. The film also featured the BAFTA-winning actress Yvonne Mitchell (with whom Patrick had starred in the 1959 production of Sapphire), and the American actors William Bendix and Aldo Ray. Cinematography was by Ted Moore. The film was shot at Ardmore Studios in Bray, Ireland.

In the film, a  man arrested for murder claims to be suffering from amnesia. Father Carey investigates the case, and looks for the killer's motive.

Story 
James Ronald Mulcahy (William Bendix), an Irish American writer, is murdered moments after he has dared God to strike him dead. His murderer (Aldo Ray) looks for help from the man who must decide his fate, the local priest, Father Carey (Nigel Patrick).  The killer is tagged "Johnny Nobody" by the press because of his claim to have total amnesia, but further investigation by Carey leads him to question whether or not "Johnny" was acting for God or, as seems more likely, a woman known as Miss Floyd (Yvonne Mitchell) who turns out to be his wife.

Cast
 Nigel Patrick as Father Carey 
 Yvonne Mitchell as Miss Floyd 
 William Bendix as James Ronald Mulcahy 
 Aldo Ray as Johnny Nobody 
 Cyril Cusack as Prosecuting Counsel O'Brien 
 Bernie Winters as Photographer 
 Niall MacGinnis as Defending Counsel Sullivan 
 Noel Purcell as Brother Timothy 
 Eddie Byrne as Landlord O'Connor 
 John Welsh as Judge 
 Joe Lynch as Tinker 
 Jimmy O'Dea as Postman Tim
 Frank O'Donovan as Garda
 May Craig as Tinker's Mother
 Norman Rodway as Father Healey
 Michael Brennan as Supt. Lynch

References

External links 

 New York Times

1961 drama films
1961 films
Films directed by Nigel Patrick
British drama films
Films scored by Ron Goodwin
Films with screenplays by Patrick Kirwan
Films about amnesia
Films about murderers
1960s English-language films
1960s British films